Aspidodiadema is a genus of echinoderms belonging to the family Aspidodiadematidae. The species of this genus are found in the Indo-Pacific and Caribbean.

Description 
The test is small and subglobular with fragile plating which is firmly tessellated. The apical disc is monocyclic. The plates membrane is embedded and does not touch the coronal plates. 

The ambulacral plating is pseudocompound with single large primary tubercle on every third plate which is much enlarged compared to the others. The primary tubercles form an alternate series down the perradius. These traits distinguish this genus from Plesiodiadema and Gymnotiara. The primary tubercles are perforated and notched. The secondary tuberculation confined to plate margins. The peristome has shallow, rounded buccal notches. 

The spines are slender and arranged in whorls. The lumens are filled with a mesh of horizontal dividers and vertical pillars.

Species 
The following species are recognised:

Aspidodiadema africanum 
Aspidodiadema annulatum 
Aspidodiadema arcitum 
Aspidodiadema hawaiiense 
Aspidodiadema intermedium 
Aspidodiadema jacobyi 
Aspidodiadema meijerei 
Aspidodiadema montanum 
Aspidodiadema multituberculatum 
Aspidodiadema nicobaricum 
Aspidodiadema sinuosum 
Aspidodiadema tonsum

References

 
Echinoidea genera